Yury Mikhaylovich Myshkovets (original name: Юрий Михайлович Мышковец, born  in ) is a Kazakhstani born Russian male weightlifter, competing in the 85 kg category and representing Russia at international competitions. He participated at the 2000 Summer Olympics in the 85 kg event. He competed at world championships, most recently at the 2003 World Weightlifting Championships.

Major results
 1996 European Championships Light-Heavyweight class (367.5 kg)
 1997 European Championships Light-Heavyweight class (377.5 kg)
 2000 European Championships Light-Heavyweight class (375.0 kg)
 2003 European Championships Light-Heavyweight class (380.0 kg)
 2006 European Championships Light-Heavyweight class (372 kg)

References

External links
 

1971 births
Living people
Russian male weightlifters
Weightlifters at the 2000 Summer Olympics
Olympic weightlifters of Russia
World Weightlifting Championships medalists